Healthmark Regional Medical Center is CLOSED.

HRMC specialized in short-term acute care.

It is permanently closed..

References 

Hospitals in Florida
Walton County, Florida